Sampark is a 1979 Bollywood film directed by Inder Sen. The film stars Madhu Kapoor, Girish Karnad and Mazhar Khan.

Cast
 Madhu Kapoor – Manniya
 Girish Karnad – Heera
 Mazhar Khan – Brindavan Biharilal
 Kulbhushan Kharbanda – Ram Pyare Misra
 Rameshwari – Champa
 Anjan Srivastav – Gokul
 Jayshree T. – Dancer

Soundtrack

External links
 

1979 films
1970s Hindi-language films